Raynor Parkinson (born in Pretoria) is a South African born German rugby union player currently playing as a Fly Half for Heidelberger RK in the German Bundesliga.

External links
  Player Profile
  School Web Site

RC Narbonne players
1988 births
Living people
German rugby union players
South African rugby union players
Rugby union fly-halves
Rugby union players from Pretoria
SC 1880 Frankfurt players
Heidelberger RK players
South African people of German descent
South African expatriate rugby union players
German expatriate rugby union players
German expatriate sportspeople in France
South African expatriate sportspeople in France
Expatriate rugby union players in France
Blackheath F.C. players
South African expatriate sportspeople in England
Expatriate rugby union players in England
Golden Lions players
University of Johannesburg alumni